During the 2004–05 English football season, Derby County F.C. competed in the Football League Championship.

Season summary
With little money to spend, Burley played the markets and made two key free signings in Iñigo Idiakez and Grzegorz Rasiak. Idiakez was voted the club's Player of the Season and Rasiak finished top scorer (with 17 goals) as Derby confounded their form of the last 5 years to grab a fourth-placed finish in the newly rebranded Football League Championship and entrance into the 2004–05 play-offs. With a more settled side than he was previously allowed – Burley only used 24 players, 7 of whom were involved in 10 or less games – and a strong mix of academy graduates (Lee Grant, Pablo Mills, Tom Huddlestone, Marcus Tudgay) and inspired purchases (Rasiak, Idiakez, Tommy Smith) Derby enjoyed a splendid second half to the season, recording just 6 defeats in their final 24 fixtures, including a run of 1 defeat in 14, and equalled the club record for away wins in a season and setting a club record of 6 consecutive away victories. However, the club entered the play-offs without the presence of key duo Rasiak and Idiakez – both unavailable through injury – and a 2–0 defeat in the first leg away to Preston North End proved impossible to overturn in the second leg at Pride Park, which finished 0–0 in front of a crowd of over 31,000. Behind the scenes, circumstances were deteriorating, and Burley left his position, citing interference from football agent turned Director of Football Murdo Mackay, and the sale of Huddlestone, to Tottenham Hotspur, against his wishes. Financial circumstances were worsening as the debt spiralled to over £30m, despite Burley building success on the pitch without any transfer funds. A refinancing scheme was put in place which saw Pride Park sold to the "mysterious" Panama-based ABC Corporation and the club paying rent of £1m a year to play there, which local journalist Gerald Mortimer described as "an affront . . . to those who put everything into building (the ground)."

Final league table

Results
Derby County's score comes first

Legend

Football League Championship

Championship play-offs

FA Cup

League Cup

Squad

Left club during season

References

Notes

Derby County F.C. seasons
Derby County F.C.